Darna, Kuno? is a 1979 Filipino film directed by Luciano B. Carlos and co-written by Toto Belano. Produced under the action, comedy, and fantasy genre, it was a family-friendly movie intended as a parody or spoof of Mars Ravelo's comic book character and female superhero Darna. The role of Darna Kuno was played by Filipino actor, Dolphy.  The film was released on March 30, 1979.

Plot
Dolphy plays Dondoy, a humble tricycle driver who was the ardent admirer of Annabel (Key). At first, Dondoy was often ridiculed by Annabel's sister Estelga (Delgado) and her mother (de Villa), who later became kind as the story progresses. The real Darna (Del Rio) in the Darna, Kuno? storyline became pregnant.  Based on the story, Darna was impregnated by the Japanese anime robots Voltes V and Mazinger Z. Because of the pregnancy someone had to take Darna's place temporarily as the superheroine until she had given birth.  The original Darna lent her magical stone (the stone that transforms Narda, Darna's alter-ego, into Darna when swallowed and the name Darna is shouted aloud) to Dolphy's character Dondoy who will become the male Darna dressed up in the female Darna costume.  Dolphy as Darna or more specifically the Darna Pretender or replacement had to fight tikbalangs, aswangs, and other enemies. Annabel became the other Darna Kuno in the story, as she stole the magical stone from Dolphy after finding out Darna Kuno’s secret identity.  Both male and female Darna Pretenders fought and defeated alien invaders.  The true Darna returned to retrieve her magical stone carrying her baby who was already wearing a Darna costume.

Cast
Dolphy as Dondoy/Darna Kuno 1
Lotis Key as Anabelle/Darna Kuno 2
Marissa Delgado as Estelga
Tita de Villa as Anabel and Estelga's mother
Romy Nario
Tonio Gutierrez
Dijay Dadivas
Karlo Vero

Special guest appearances
Brenda del Rio as the real Darna
German Moreno as San Pedro
Sandy Garcia
Christopher de Leon as Chris, Anabelle's cousin
Bella Flores as the chief manananggal
Celia Rodriguez as the organ player who stole the brides
Charo Valdez
Rio Locsin
Lily Miraflor
Ruel Vernal as the spaceship alien
Bata Batuta Characters
Alice Kamatis
Kardong Kayod
Tak-talaok

See also
Zsazsa Zaturnnah

References

External links

1979 films
Philippine superhero films
Superheroine films
Philippine parody films
Philippine science fiction action films
Philippine science fantasy films
Darna
Fictional Filipino people
Regal Entertainment films
Philippine films based on comics
Films based on Philippine comics
Films directed by Luciano B. Carlos